Pediculariinae is a subfamily of small to large predatory or parasitic sea snails, marine gastropod molluscs in the family Ovulidae and the superfamily Cypraeoidea, the cowries and the cowry allies. As of 2009, it comprises 48 described species of which 20 are regarded as valid by most scientists.

Taxonomy 
Simone (2004) placed some genera in the family Pediculariidae which were previously in the family Ovulidae. Comparison of the shell, radula and morphology suggested a closer phylogenetic relationship to the Pediculariidae than to the Lamellariidae, the Eratoidae/Triviidae, or the Ovulidae. However, both the validity of the family Pediculariidae, and its proper position within the superfamily Cypraeoidea, remain controversial. As of 2019, the World Register of Marine Species considers it a subfamily of the family Ovulidae.

2005 taxonomy 
According to the taxonomy of Bouchet & Rocroi (2005) the subfamily Pediculariinae was included within the family Ovulidae.

2007 taxonomy 
Fehse (2007) raised the subfamily Pediculariinae to the level of family as Pediculariidae, based on morphological research on the radulae, the shell, the soft part morphology and  molecular phylogeny research on the 16S ribosomal RNA gene.

Genera 

The subfamily Pediculariinae contains the following tribes and genera:
tribe Cypraediini Schilder, 1927
† Cypraedia Swainson, 1840
† Eucypraedia Schilder, 1939
Jenneria Jousseaume, 1884
Pseudocypraea Schilder, 1925
tribe Pediculariini Gray, 1853
† Cypraeopsis Schilder, 1936
Lunovula Rosenberg, 1990
Pedicularia Swainson, 1840
Pedicypraedia Lorenz, 2009
not assigned to a tribe
† Cypropterina de Gregorio, 1880
† Lozouetina Dolin & Dockery, 2018
† Olianatrivia Dolin, Biosca-Munts & Parcerisa, 2013
† Transovula de Gregorio, 1880

Description 
The species in this subfamily differ in a radical way from other species in the Ovulidae by the morphology of the first and second marginal teeth in their radula. While these are symmetrical (and even palmaceous) in the Ovulidae, they are asymmetrical, as can be seen in Pseudocypraea adamsonii Sowerby, 1832 (formed like a swatter) or in Jenneria pustulata and Pedicularia sicula (formed like a whip).

Feeding habits 
These sea snails feed on stony corals (Scleractinia) and hydrozoans.

References

Further reading 

 
Taxa named by John Edward Gray